James Henry Williams (born November 15, 1960) is a former American Football linebacker who played mainly for the Detroit Lions in an 11-year career that lasted from 1982 to 1993 in the National Football League. He was the head coach for Ann Arbor Pioneer High School for one season before getting released on good terms with the school.

Williams played college football at University of Nebraska where he was an All-American defensive end. He came into Nebraska as only a walk-on. He was drafted in the first round of the 1982 NFL Draft by the Lions, as the 15th overall pick.

References

1960 births
Living people
American football linebackers
Buffalo Bulls football coaches
Detroit Lions players
Eastern Michigan Eagles football coaches
Grand Valley State Lakers football coaches
Minnesota Vikings players
Nebraska Cornhuskers football coaches
Nebraska Cornhuskers football players
Tampa Bay Buccaneers players
Toledo Rockets football coaches
UAB Blazers football coaches
High school football coaches in Michigan
Players of American football from Washington, D.C.
Woodrow Wilson High School (Washington, D.C.) alumni
Ed Block Courage Award recipients